The franc was the currency of Martinique until 2002. It was subdivided into 100 centimes. The French franc circulated, alongside banknotes issued specifically for Martinique between 1855 and 1961 and notes issued for Martinique, French Guiana and Guadeloupe (collectively referred to as the French Antilles) between 1961 and 1975.

Coins
In 1897 and 1922, cupro-nickel 50 centimes and 1 franc coins were issued.

Banknotes

In 1855, the Colonial Treasury introduced 1 and 5 francs Bons de Caisse, followed by 2 and 10 francs in 1884.

In 1874, the Banque de la Martinique introduced 5 francs notes, followed by 100 and 500 francs in 1905, 1 and 2 francs in 1915, and 25 francs in 1922. Between 1942 and 1945, a final series of notes was issued by the Banque de la Martinique in denominations of 5, 25, 100 and 1000 francs.

In 1944, the Caisse Centrale de la France Libre (Central Cashier of Free France) introduced 1000 francs notes. The same year, the Caisse Centrale de la France d'Outre Mer (Central Cashier for Overseas France) introduced notes for 10, 20, 100 and 1000 francs. In 1947, a new series of notes was introduced in denominations of 5, 10, 20, 50, 100, 500, 1000 and 5000. These notes shared their designs with the notes issued for French Guiana and Guadeloupe.

In 1961, 100, 500, 1000 and 5000 francs notes were overstamped with their values in nouveax francs (new francs): 1, 5, 10 and 50 nouveax francs. The same year, a new series of notes was introduced with the names of Guadeloupe, French Guiana and Martinique on them. In 1963, the Institut d'Emission des Départements d'Outre-Mer (Institute for Emissions in the Overseas Departments) took over paper money production in the three departments, issuing 10 and 50 nouveax francs notes. These were followed in 1964 by notes for 5, 10, 50 and 100 francs, the word nouveaux having been dropped.

See also

French Guianan franc
Guadeloupe franc
Economy of Martinique

References

External links
 

Modern obsolete currencies
Franc
2002 disestablishments in North America
Currencies of the Caribbean